Phullu Punchu (Quechua phullu mantilla, punchu poncho, also spelled Phullu Poncho) is a mountain in the Tunari mountain range of the Bolivian Andes which reaches a height of approximately  . It is located in the Cochabamba Department, Quillacollo Province, Vinto Municipality. Phullu Punchu lies southwest of Tunari.

References 

Mountains of Cochabamba Department